Matt Guelfi (born 14 August 1997) is an Australian rules footballer playing for the Essendon Football Club in the Australian Football League (AFL). Guelfi is from Western Australia where he played for Claremont in the West Australian Football League. After being overlooked in previous drafts, he was drafted by Essendon with their third selection and seventy-sixth overall in the 2017 national draft.

AFL career
He made his AFL debut in the twenty-two point win against  at Etihad Stadium in round 4 of the 2018 season.

On 4 September 2019, Guelfi signed a contract extension with Essendon until the end of the 2021 season.

In 2022, Guelfi enjoyed a career best season establishing himself as a quality pressure forward and culminating with a third placed finish in the club's Best and Fairest.  He was also awarded the McCracken Medal as the 'Player's Player'.

Following this, he signed a two year contract extension that would keep him at the club until the end of 2024.

Statistics
Statistics are correct to the end of 2020

|- style="background-color: #EAEAEA"
! scope="row" style="text-align:center" | 2018
|  || 35 || 15 || 5 || 6 || 129 || 98 || 227 || 50 || 46 || 0.3 || 0.4 || 8.6 || 6.5 || 15.1 || 3.3 || 3.1
|-
! scope="row" style="text-align:center" | 2019
|  || 35 || 17 || 3 || 2 || 136 || 97 || 233 || 55 || 50 || 0.2 || 0.1 || 8.0 || 5.7 || 13.7 || 3.2 || 2.9
|- style="background-color: #EAEAEA"
! scope="row" style="text-align:center" | 2020
|  || 35 || 11 || 0 || 0 || 72 || 67 || 139 || 37 || 18 || 0.0 || 0.0 || 6.6 || 6.1 || 12.6 || 3.4 || 1.6
|- class="sortbottom"
! colspan=3| Career
! 43
! 8
! 8
! 337
! 262
! 599
! 142
! 113
! 0.2
! 0.2
! 7.8
! 6.1
! 13.9
! 3.3
! 2.6
|}

References

External links

1997 births
Living people
Essendon Football Club players
Claremont Football Club players
Australian rules footballers from Western Australia